This timeline of Apple II Family models lists all major types of Apple II computers produced by Apple Computer in order of introduction date. The Apple I and Apple III are included, even though they are not classed as part of the Apple II series, because of their unique role in Apple's product lineup of the era.

Detailed timeline

See also 
 Timeline of Apple products – includes complete list of Apple II family peripherals and software sold by Apple
 Timeline of Macintosh models

References

External links
 Specifications, Apple Computer, Inc.
 Steven Weyhrich, Apple II History, apple2history.org
 Glen Sanford, Apple History, apple-history.com
 Dan Knight, Computer Profiles, LowEndMac, Cobweb Publishing, Inc.
 Apple Product Design Timeline

3
Apple II family
Apple II family
Apple II family